Pumpville is a ghost town in Val Verde County, Texas, United States.

History
The village was founded in 1882, following the construction of the Galveston, Harrisburg and San Antonio Railway, on which it had a station, now closed. A post office operated from 1899 until 1970 and a Baptist Church is still operating. From 1968 until 2000, Pumpville had a population of 21.

Geography
Located on the Amtrak railway routes Sunset Limited and Texas Eagle between Sanderson and Del Rio stations, Pumpville lies on the Ranch to Market Road 1865, few miles east of the borders of Terrell County, 12 miles east of the ghost town of Cedar Station.

See also
List of ghost towns in Texas

References

External links
Pumpville Weather (accuweather.com)

Populated places in Val Verde County, Texas
Ghost towns in West Texas